José Bernal (born 1927) is a Venezuelan former sports shooter. He competed in the 50 metre pistol event at the 1956 Summer Olympics.

References

External links
 

1927 births
Possibly living people
Venezuelan male sport shooters
Olympic shooters of Venezuela
Shooters at the 1956 Summer Olympics
Pan American Games bronze medalists for Venezuela
Pan American Games medalists in shooting
Place of birth missing (living people)
Shooters at the 1955 Pan American Games
20th-century Venezuelan people